Barbara Brandon-Croft (born November 27, 1958) is an American cartoonist, best known for creating the comic strip Where I'm Coming From, and for being the first nationally syndicated African-American female cartoonist.

Early life
Brandon-Croft was born in Brooklyn, New York, to Brumsic Brandon Jr. Her father was also a cartoonist and he was the creator of the comic strip Luther which was in circulation from 1970 to 1986 under the Los Angeles Times Syndicate newspapers. She and her father are said to represent the only occurrence of father-daughter newspaper cartoonists.

She attended the College of Visual and Performing Arts at Syracuse University. In 1982, she developed a cartoon feature for Elan, a magazine for black women. She later joined the staff of Essence magazine as their fashion and beauty writer. She also created illustrations for The Crisis, published by the NAACP; as well as for The Village Voice and MCA Records.

Brandon-Croft's illustrating talent had developed naturally. Growing up she helped her father with his comics in exchange for allowance. She was first recognized for the comic strip Where I'm Coming From. She later did other illustrations including Sista Girl-Fren Breaks It Down...When Mom's Not Around. Brandon-Croft also created a line of illustrated greeting cards for OZ.

Where I'm Coming From
Brandon-Croft started publishing Where I'm Coming From beginning in 1989 in the Detroit Free Press. The comic strip traces the experiences of about twelve African-American women and gives insight into the challenges of being an African American woman living in the United States. It features characters such as Alisha, Cheryl, Lekesia, Nicole and others. The characters are based on Brandon and her real-life friends.

The artwork is minimalistic. There is an absence of backdrop drawings, with the focus solely on the characters who are represented by drawings of their upper torso. Speech bubbles are also omitted and the characters address the reader directly.

Where I'm Coming From went into national syndication in 1991 with the Universal Press Syndicate making Brandon-Croft the first female black cartoonist to be nationally syndicated. It was the first comic strip by a black woman to be syndicated in mainstream newspapers. The comic strip was featured in more than sixty newspapers between 1989 and 2004. It appeared in newspapers throughout the United States, including Essence, The Sacramento Bee, The Atlanta Journal-Constitution and The Baltimore Sun, as well as in The Gleaner in Jamaica and the Johannesburg Drum magazine. Brandon-Croft ceased publication of the comic strips in 2005 after subscriptions dwindled.

Brandon-Croft and her father's work are both represented in the Library of Congress and in editions of Best Editorial Cartoons of the Year.

Personal life
Brandon-Croft is married to Monte Croft, with whom she has one child, Chase, and resides in Queens, New York.

Exhibitions 
 2020 "Still... Racism in America: A Retrospective in Cartoons" (Medialia Gallery, New York City) — joint exhibition with Brandon-Croft and her father Brumsic Brandon Jr.

Bibliography

See also 
 Jackie Ormes
 Morrie Turner

Further reading
 Ito, Robert. "A Trailblazing Black Cartoonist’s Work: ‘It’s Unapologetic, and It’s the Truth’" New York Times Feb 7, 2023 online

References

External links
 Access to digitized editions of Where I'm Coming From at the Library of Congress.

1958 births
Living people
African-American comics creators
American women cartoonists
American comic strip cartoonists
American female comics artists
Artists from Brooklyn
20th-century American artists
20th-century American women artists
21st-century American artists
21st-century American women artists
Syracuse University alumni
20th-century African-American women
20th-century African-American people
20th-century African-American artists
21st-century African-American women
21st-century African-American artists